Spent may refer to:
 Spent (band), a former indie rock band
 Spent (game), an online game about surviving poverty and homelessness
 Spent, a collection of Peepshow comics by Joe Matt
 Spent: Sex, Evolution, and Consumer Behavior, a 2009 book by Geoffrey Miller

See also
 Spend
 Spent enactment
 Spent nuclear fuel, a fuel no longer useful for sustaining a nuclear reaction